Censavudine (INN) (BMS-986001) is an investigational new drug being developed by Bristol Myers-Squibb for the treatment of HIV infection. It was originally developed at Yale University.

Renaming
Until 2013, censavudine has been known as festinavir, but the name was changed to avoid confusion with HIV protease inhibitors which all bear class suffix "–navir" (e.g. tipranavir, lopinavir, saquinavir etc.).

References

Bristol Myers Squibb
Nucleoside analog reverse transcriptase inhibitors
Pyrimidinediones
Experimental drugs
Hydroxymethyl compounds
Ethynyl compounds